Tin(IV) fluoride is a chemical compound of tin and fluorine with the chemical formula SnF4 and is a white solid with a melting point above 700 °C.

SnF4 can be prepared by the reaction of tin metal with fluorine gas:
Sn + 2F2 → SnF4
However, a passivating metal fluoride layer will be created and the surface will eventually become unreactive.  An alternative synthesis is the reaction of SnCl4 with anhydrous hydrogen fluoride:
SnCl4 + 4HF → SnF4 + 4HCl
With alkali metal fluorides (e.g. KF) hexafluorostannates are produced (e.g.K2SnF6), which contain the octahedral SnF62− anion. SnF4 behaves as a Lewis acid and adducts L2·SnF4 and L·SnF4 have been produced.

Structure 
Unlike the other tin tetrahalides, tin(IV) chloride, tin(IV) bromide, and tin(IV) iodide, which contain tetrahedrally coordinated tin, tin(IV) fluoride contains planar layers of octahedrally coordinated tin, where the octahedra share four corners and there are two terminal, unshared, fluorine atoms trans to one another. The melting point of SnF4 is much higher (700 °C) than the other tin(IV) halides which are relatively low melting, (SnCl4, −33.3 °C; SnBr4, 31 °C; SnI4, 144 °C). The structure can also be contrasted with the tetrafluorides of the lighter members of group 14, (CF4, SiF4 and GeF4) which in the solid state form molecular crystals.

See also
Stannous fluoride

References 

Fluorides
Tin(IV) compounds
Metal halides